Qeqertarsuatsiaq Island (old spelling: Qeqertarssuatsiaq) is an isolated and uninhabited island in the Avannaata municipality, in Baffin Bay off the western shore of Greenland.

Geography 
Qeqertarsuatsiaaq Island is separated from the much larger Disko Island in the southeast by the Maligaat sound, and from Nuussuaq Peninsula in the northeast by the Sullorsuaq Strait.

References 

Islands of Baffin Bay
Disko Bay
Uninhabited islands of Greenland